is a railway station on the Soya Main Line in Nakagawa, Nakagawa District (Teshio), Hokkaido, Japan, operated by the Hokkaido Railway Company (JR Hokkaido).

Lines

Layout
The station has two side platforms serving two tracks. Passenger access between the two platforms is via a level crossing across the tracks.

Platforms

Adjacent stations

History

The station opened on 8 November 1922, originally named . It was renamed Teshio-Nakagawa Station on 20 July 1951. With the privatization of Japanese National Railways (JNR) on 1 April 1987, the station came under the control of JR Hokkaido.

See also
 List of railway stations in Japan

References

External links

  

Railway stations in Hokkaido Prefecture
Sōya Main Line
Stations of Hokkaido Railway Company
Railway stations in Japan opened in 1922